New Durham, New Jersey may refer to:

New Durham, North Bergen, New Jersey
New Durham, Middlesex County, New Jersey